Davis v. United States, 512 U.S. 452 (1994), was a United States Supreme Court case in which the Court established that the right to counsel can only be legally asserted by an "unambiguous or unequivocal request for counsel."

Background
A bloodstain on one of the pool cues in the recreation hall led Naval Investigative Service (NIS) agents to Robert L. Davis. During questioning, Davis said, “Maybe I should talk to a lawyer.” When asked by the interviewers to clarify his ambiguous request, Davis responded that he did not want counsel. After his conviction of murder, Davis tried to appeal, claiming that his right to counsel was declined. However, his conviction was affirmed when his request for counsel was reviewed, deemed ambiguous, and it was concluded that the NIS indeed clarify his intentions before continuing with questioning.

Opinion of the Court
According to the court, the interrogators opted for the clarification method to determine if Davis's request for counsel was ambiguous or not. When Davis said “Maybe I should talk to a lawyer”, the interrogators replied by saying that they would not violate his rights. They made it clear that if he wanted a lawyer, they would have stopped the interrogation. When the interrogators asked for clarification, Davis answered that he was not asking for a lawyer. Therefore, the interrogators did not believe his request for counsel was ambiguous since Davis announced he was not requesting counsel in the first place.

Nevertheless, Justice O’Connor decided otherwise. She declared that the threshold of clarity approach was legally required for this case. Thus, the Supreme Court ruled that an ambiguous and unclear request for counsel, such as David's “Maybe I should talk to a lawyer”, does not establish the right. The reasoning was that the defendant's rights under Edwards were not sufficiently requested with his utterance. The request for a lawyer must be clear and unambiguous. Justice O’Connor understands that fear, intimidation, and lack of linguistic and interrogation knowledge may affect the way the defendant requests a lawyer. However, she held that the Miranda Rights should be enough for the defendants to understand their right for counsel which lead to the decision that Davis's request was ambiguous.

Related Cases
Davis’ case is not independent in legislative history. Many cases have dealt with ambiguous requests for counsel. Among these include Smith v. Illinois. Smith was arrested, understood his Miranda rights, and when asked if he wanted a lawyer, Smith responded yes. However, his request for counsel was deemed ambiguous because he continued to answer questions during the investigation before a lawyer was present, thus terminating his request. In the following case, State v. Demesme, defendant Warren Demesme's request for counsel was declined when he asked “why don’t you just give me a lawyer, dog.” Under review, his statement was deemed ambiguous. In another case, People v. Krueger, Michael Krueuger claims investigators continued to question him after his request to counsel, thus violating his Miranda rights. His request “Maybe I ought to have an attorney,”  was deemed ambiguous.

See also
 List of United States Supreme Court cases
 Lists of United States Supreme Court cases by volume
 List of United States Supreme Court cases by the Rehnquist Court

References

External links
 

United States Supreme Court cases
United States Supreme Court cases of the Rehnquist Court
1994 in United States case law
1994 in cue sports
Miranda warning case law
Pool (cue sports)